You Can't Stop the Reign is the third studio album by American basketball player and rapper Shaquille O'Neal. It was released on November 19, 1996, and features production from the likes of DJ Quik, Poke and Tone, Mobb Deep, Chris Large, and Easy Mo Bee.

The album was moderately successful, peaking at number 82 on the Billboard 200 and number 21 on the Top R&B/Hip-Hop Albums. Two singles were released, "You Can't Stop the Reign" and "Strait Playin'". The Notorious B.I.G.'s verse from "You Can't Stop the Reign" was reused in Michael Jackson's song "Unbreakable", from his last studio album Invincible.

Critical reception

Track listing

Sample credits
 "You Can't Stop the Reign" contains a sample of "You Can't Stop the Rain" by Loose Ends.
 "It Was All a Dream" contains a sample of "Don't Do Me This Way" by Alicia Myers.
 "Legal Money" contains a sample of "Stop, Look, Listen (To Your Heart)" performed by Diana Ross and Marvin Gaye, and written by Thom Bell and Linda Creed.
 "Edge of Night" contains a sample of "In the Air Tonight" by Phil Collins.
 "Let's Wait a While" contains a sample of "Let's Wait Awhile" by Janet Jackson.
 "Just Be Good to Me" contains a sample of "Just Be Good to Me" performed by The S.O.S. Band.
 "Game of Death" contains a sample of "Children of the Sun" by Mandrill.

Charts

Weekly charts

References

Shaquille O'Neal albums
1996 albums
Interscope Records albums
Albums produced by DJ Quik
Albums produced by Domingo (producer)
Albums produced by Easy Mo Bee
Albums produced by Havoc (musician)
Albums produced by Rodney Jerkins
Albums produced by Trackmasters